Aghcheh Qayah (also Romanized as Āghcheh Qayah and Āghcheh Qeyeh; also known as Aghcheh Ghīyeh, Āghjeh Qayeh, Aqchīgayeh, Āqjeh Qayeh, Āqjeh Qeyeh, and Āqjeh Qīyah) is a village in Ali Sadr Rural District, Gol Tappeh District, Kabudarahang County, Hamadan Province, Iran. At the 2006 census, its population was 357, in 83 families.

References 

Populated places in Kabudarahang County